is a former Japanese football player and manager. currently assistant manager J2 League club of Tokyo Verdy.

Coaching career
Ogura became coach for JEF United Ichihara from 1992 to 2006. Since 2006, he became assistant coach for Japan national team under manager; Ivica Osim (2006-2007) and Takeshi Okada (2008-2010). Japan advanced to the knockout round in 2010 FIFA World Cup. After World Cup, he became assistant coach for Japan U-23 national team aiming for 2012 Summer Olympics under manager; Takashi Sekizuka. Japan advanced to the semi-finals in 2012 Summer Olympics. After Summer Olympics, he became assistant coach for Omiya Ardija under manager; Zdenko Verdenik. But in August 2013, manager; Zdenko Verdenik was sacked. So Tsutomu Ogura became new manager. From 2014, he became assistant coach for Ventforet Kofu (2014) and JEF United Chiba (2015-2016).

Managerial statistics

References

External links

soccerway.com

1966 births
Living people
Tenri University alumni
Association football people from Osaka Prefecture
Japanese footballers
Japanese football managers
J1 League managers
Omiya Ardija managers
Association footballers not categorized by position